Adrianna Pennino-Balboa is a fictional character from the Rocky series, played by Talia Shire.

Shire was nominated for the Academy Award for Best Actress for her portrayal of Adrian in Rocky. The final scene in Rocky II, in which Rocky yells "Yo Adrian, I did it!", has been named by film enthusiasts as one of the most iconic quotes in sports film history.

Casting
Originally, Stallone offered Carrie Snodgress the role of Adrian, but she turned it down due to the low salary she was offered. Susan Sarandon was considered, but she was turned down because she was deemed too pretty to play the mousy character of Adrian. Talia Shire then auditioned for the role, and was selected.

Biography

Rocky

In the first film, Adrian is an Italian-American woman working at the J&M Tropical Fish pet store in Philadelphia, where a small-time boxer, Rocky Balboa, would visit frequently, needing food for his pet turtles. Adrian explains about her quiet and shy philosophy towards Rocky, but is later brought into a relationship with Rocky by her brother, Paulie.

Adrian and Rocky later go to an ice rink on Thanksgiving Day, where Rocky told her about his fighting career and his style. She asked him why he wanted to be a boxer, and he said that his father told him that he had no brains, and should develop his body. Adrian is surprised, as her mother said that she didn't have much of a body and should develop her brain. As the two begin dating, she gives Rocky a dog from the shop that he's admired; a bull mastiff named Butkus. On Christmas, an inebriated Paulie overhears her conversation with Rocky about Paulie's interferences. An enraged and drunken Paulie physically threatens her and Rocky with a sawed-off baseball bat, only for Adrian to stand up for herself. Then, he taunts her for not being a virgin, which sends Adrian crying, running towards her room, but Rocky stops the tirade, and later offers her to stay at his apartment. Before Rocky's upcoming match against Apollo Creed, Adrian decides to stay in Rocky's locker room. As the rounds go by, she eventually comes out during the 14th. As she witnesses Rocky get knocked down by Apollo, she briefly closes her eyes in silence. At the end of the match, Rocky calls out for her and Adrian rushes toward the ring, losing her hat along the way. As Paulie is denied entrance into the ring by security, she manages to slip inside the ring when he pulls up the ropes. While Creed is announced the winner, she appears to Rocky, to which he asks where her hat was, only for her to express her love for him.

Rocky II

In the second film, Adrian witnesses Rocky in the hospital after his recent match against Apollo Creed. At first, Apollo goads Rocky into a rematch, but Rocky, instead, intends on retiring from boxing, and undergoes surgery for retinal detachment. After his release from the hospital, Rocky proposes to Adrian at the Philadelphia Zoo, and the couple marry on February 8, 1976. With his earnings, they manage to find a new home and purchase a Pontiac Trans Am. That next month, they discover that they are expecting a baby. After a failed attempt to appear in commercials to capitalize on his newfound fame, Rocky struggles to look for other jobs, eventually prompting him to sell his Pontiac to Paulie. When Rocky announces his intention to come out of his hiatus from boxing to have a rematch with Apollo, Adrian tries to discourage him. Although Mickey encourages him, without Adrian's support he doesn't train well. Worried about money, Adrian returns part-time to the pet store. Due to the amount of lifting with her job and after a heated argument with her brother about her refusal to stand by Rocky's decision, she goes into premature labor, collapsing on the job, and gives birth to a boy. Due to excessive blood loss during labor, she slips into a coma. Rocky becomes distraught, and promises to stay with her until she awakens. In addition to Rocky, she is also visited by Mickey and Paulie. A week later, she regains consciousness. Rocky had refused to see the baby until Adrian came out of the coma. They saw their newborn son for the first time together and at Adrian's suggestion, named him Robert Balboa, Jr. (Robert being Rocky's real first name). Soon after, Adrian tells Rocky to win for her, giving her blessing for him to fight. On the night of the rematch, she stays home along with Paulie to watch the match as she was still recovering. Watching the fight on television, she becomes shocked during the final round as both Rocky and Apollo hit the floor. Both combatants slowly attempt to get back up, but Rocky emerges victorious by just one second, while Apollo stays down, losing the world champion title to Rocky. Adrian and Paulie celebrate and begin to shed tears of joy as Rocky calls out for her in victory.

Rocky III

The movie begins with showing that Rocky has been very successful and living an opulent lifestyle. Rocky convinces Mickey to move into his mansion so he can look out for him. Rocky, Adrian and Mickey attend the unveiling of a bronze statue in honor of the "Italian Stallion" at the Philadelphia Museum of Art. Overwhelmed by the generosity of the city, Rocky announces his plan to retire from professional boxing. With the crowd booing in disbelief, Clubber Lang, a new up and coming boxer, comes forth and challenges Rocky, harshly berating him for being a coward and a "puppet". Mickey interrupts Lang's tirade to prevent Rocky from hearing the truth that Mickey hand-picked the ten competitors that Rocky defeated. Then Lang taunts Adrian with overtly sexual remarks; he'll show her a "real man". causing a goaded Rocky to agree to a match. With his preparation open to the public, Rocky is not able to train seriously for the fight. While his female fans would try to get close to him, Adrian would remain silent, watching in the background. Just minutes before the match, Lang verbally lashes out at Rocky, creating a scuffle, in which Lang shoves Mickey down to the floor, causing him to suffer cardiac arrest. Being escorted back into the locker room, Rocky becomes worried and plans to call the match off, but Mickey tells to him pull himself together, to which Rocky would ask Adrian to stay with him until a doctor comes. Rocky quickly loses the match against Lang, and Mickey dies from a heart attack. Only she, Rocky, Paulie, and Al Savani (his cutman) gather for Mickey's burial. Adrian tags along with Rocky and Paulie as they travel to Los Angeles to train with Apollo Creed for a rematch. Noticing that her husband is not giving his complete focus, Adrian confronts Rocky on the Santa Monica Beach. During the argument, Rocky reveals that he is afraid of losing, but Adrian ensures that they have everything that they have ever dreamed, such as fame and fortune, and that she will always be there for him, regardless of whether he wins or loses. Bolstered by this, Rocky goes on to regain his title from Lang.

Rocky IV

In the fourth film, Adrian and Rocky are visited by Apollo Creed, who has plans to have an exhibition match against a Russian Soviet Union boxer, Ivan Drago. After hearing his reasons, Adrian tries to discourage Creed, and tells him that she deeply cares about his well-being. Despite her suggestions, an exhibition match between the two materialize. Adrian attends the press conference, sitting with Apollo's wife, Mary Anne. Adrian witnesses the match between Creed and Drago, with Drago beating Creed mightily, causing Creed to die on the spot. Witnessing Apollo's death, she also attends his funeral alongside her husband. Sometime later, Adrian is notified by the press of Rocky announcing his plans to challenge Drago on Christmas in Russia. That night, she and Rocky argue about the risks, Adrian telling him that this is a match that he cannot win. Weeks after Rocky leaves with Paulie and Tony "Duke" Evers to Russia to train, Adrian surprises him there, and reassures that she will always be with him, no matter what. During the match, Drago overpowers Rocky, making it difficult for her to watch. But, after a moment of seriousness, Rocky delivers a punch that cuts Drago underneath his eye, causing Adrian to shout at Rocky to hit him, thus evening the playing field. After a decisive match, Rocky wins by knockout in the final round.

Rocky V

In the fifth film, shortly after the match with Drago, Adrian sits with her husband who is showing signs of complications. Upon their return to the United States, they reunite with their son, Robert, and hold a subsequent press conference. With questions about the complications were brought forth, she quickly denies it and states that her husband is in fit condition. But, Rocky is interrupted by fight promoter, George Washington Duke, in hopes of creating another lucrative match. Adrian takes the podium to announce that Rocky is retiring, which stuns the audience.

Settling back home, Rocky overhears her and Paulie arguing about a dramatic life-changing situation. Paulie inadvertently has Rocky and Adrian give their accountant a power of attorney. In recoil, the accountant subsequently embezzled and squandered the Balboas' money on real estate deals gone sour, costing the Balboas their entire fortune and virtually all of their assets. In addition, the accountant had failed to pay Rocky's taxes over the past six years, and the mansion has been mortgaged by $400,000. Rocky tells Adrian that he wants to fight again to recoup their assets, but she requests that he should be tested with a physician's approval firsthand. The doctor performs computer-simulated tests, confirming that Rocky is diagnosed with a form of brain damage, and the effects are permanent and irreversible, making it impossible for him to be licensed to box in any state. While Rocky tries to go against his physician's orders, Adrian reassures him that they could make it through, and Rocky reluctantly acknowledges that it's time to retire from boxing.

From their lavish lifestyle, they return to the streets, moving into Paulie's old house in South Philadelphia. Returning to her job at the J&M Tropical Fish pet shop, she and Rocky are cornered by Duke. Rocky would consider offers, but Adrian would deny all of them, as she knows it's a matter of money, and Rocky would be severely disabled if he were to come out of retirement again. She becomes skeptical when Rocky invites a young ruffian boxer from Oklahoma, Tommy "the Machine" Gunn, to stay with them. With Rocky spending his time training Tommy, it creates a rift between Rocky and Robert. Duke managed to catch Tommy's attention, which causes him to part ways from his mentor.

Adrian comes to Rocky's aid, following his dispute with Tommy, leaving Rocky severely frustrated. Rocky saw their relationship as another way of winning, getting back to the life they once lived, but Adrian attests to that, citing that the partnership was actually destroying their family, and should he pass down values, as well as passing it on to his son. From this, Rocky calms down and reconciles with Robert. As Tommy and Rocky engage in a street fight, she is notified by Robert, and the two make their way to the scene. Adrian is last seen walking away with the family in high spirits after Rocky emerged victorious.

Rocky Balboa

In autumn of 2001, Adrian discovered that she was dying from ovarian cancer. She underwent chemotherapy, but it was not enough to save her life. Adrian died peacefully in her sleep on January 11, 2002, in Philadelphia, Pennsylvania, with her family along her side, aged 51.

In the years since, Rocky, trying to break out of his bankruptcy, manages to open a small Italian restaurant, named after her. The walls of the restaurant showcase pictures of Adrian, Italian heritage, as well as Rocky's sports memorabilia, such as ringside photographs, clippings from newspapers, paintings, and his championship belts.

Creed

Adrian doesn't physically appear in Creed, having previously died from ovarian cancer, but photos of her are seen around Rocky's restaurant (which was named after her). When Rocky goes to the graveyard he first goes and puts her brother Paulie's favorite alcoholic drink on his gravestone next to Adrian's. He then places a single red rose at the base of Adrian's headstone and then reads the newspaper to her and Paulie.

When Rocky is diagnosed with Non-Hodgkin lymphoma, Rocky initially chooses not to undergo chemotherapy, partly because Adrian's own treatment had failed, and partly because most of his loved ones have died.  Eventually, however, Rocky's new protege, Adonis Creed persuades him to keep fighting.

Creed II

In Creed II, Rocky again visits Adrian and Paulie's graves and admits that he has been unable to bring himself to call his son Robert, who had moved to Vancouver years earlier.  At the end of the film, Rocky goes to see Robert and meets his grandson Logan for the first time, remarking how much he looks like Adrian.

Other media
In the 2012 Broadway musical based on the first Rocky film, Adrian Pennino was portrayed by Margo Seibert.

References

Fictional housewives
Fictional characters with cancer
Fictional Italian American people
Fictional characters from Philadelphia
Rocky characters
Film characters introduced in 1976
Female characters in film